Wayne C. Grover (September 14, 1906 – June 8, 1970) served as Third Archivist of the United States.

Career
Grover joined the National Archives staff in 1935. During World War II he earned the Legion of Merit for the management of Army wartime records as chief of the Records Management Branch. During his tenure as Archivist of the United States (from 1948 to 1965), the Presidential Library system was established, and he helped develop the Truman Library, the Eisenhower Presidential Center, and the Lyndon B. Johnson Library and Museum.

Also during this period, the National Archives produced the first code of ethics for the archival profession, prepared as part of its inservice training program and published under the title "The Archivist's Code"; Grover was known to be the author, although his name did not appear in the 1955 publication.

Grover was a founding member of the Society of American Archivists and served as its president from 1953 to 1954. He also served as the Western Hemisphere vice president of the International Council on Archives.

He died of cancer at his home in Silver Spring, Maryland.

References

External links

Official site
Archivists of the United States, 1934 - Present

1906 births
1970 deaths
American archivists
National Archives and Records Administration
Recipients of the Legion of Merit
People from Garland, Utah
Presidents of the Society of American Archivists
Lyndon B. Johnson administration personnel
Kennedy administration personnel
Eisenhower administration personnel
Truman administration personnel